Chisa Okugawa (born 24 August 1995) is a Japanese professional footballer who plays as a defender for WE League club MyNavi Sendai.

Club career 
Okugawa made her WE League debut on 12 September 2021.

References 

Living people
1995 births
Japanese women's footballers
Women's association football defenders
Association football people from Aichi Prefecture
Mynavi Vegalta Sendai Ladies players
WE League players